Season 2000–2001 of the Tercera División (4th Level).

Group I

Group II

Group III

Note: CD Miengo resigned to playing in the group on economic grounds.

Group IV

Group V

Group VI

Group VII

Group VIII

Group IX

Group X

Group XI

Group XII

Group XIII

Group XIV

Group XV

Group XVI

Group XVII

Promotion play-off
Source:

Notes

External links
Futbolme.com

 
1998-99
4
Spain